Essis Baudelaire Fulgence Aka (born 10 January 1990) is an Ivorian professional footballer who plays as a midfielder.

International career

International goals
Scores and results list Ivory Coast's goal tally first.

References

External links 
 

1990 births
Living people
Ivorian footballers
Ivory Coast international footballers
Association football midfielders
People from Dabou
2016 African Nations Championship players
Ivory Coast A' international footballers